Food self-provisioning (FSP) is the growing of one's own food, especially fruits and vegetables. Also labelled as household food production, is a traditional activity persisting in the countries of the Global North. It is studied in Sustainability science and in ecofeminism on reason of its social, health and environmental outcomes.

References

ecology
natural resources
Human impact on the environment